The Very Best of Supertramp is a greatest hits album by the English rock band Supertramp, originally released by A&M Records in June 1990.

Overview 
The compilation is basically a new version of the Autobiography/Classics Vol. 9 CD with the additional song "School" inserted as track 1. Furthermore, all songs are featured in their full-length album versions. The cover depicts the grate from the cover of Crime of the Century, the hand carrying the glass from the cover of Breakfast in America and the orange umbrella from Crisis? What Crisis?. Tracks from their self-titled album Supertramp and Indelibly Stamped were not included.

Reception

In their retrospective review, AllMusic noted that effectively compiling Supertramp's work is impossible since the group is so album-oriented. However, they offered a relative recommendation for The Very Best of Supertramp, saying that "it flows very smoothly" and is "the closest thing to a definitive overview of the '70s pop-prog group."

Alternative version
A Dutch release, also titled The Very Best of Supertramp, was issued in late 1989, featuring the same tracks but in a different order and a different sleeve. It was compiled by Dutch compilation label Arcade, although it was later re-issued on the A&M label. The album was a major success in the Dutch chart, spending nine weeks at number one and 70 weeks in total. Given its success, A&M did not officially release the alternative The Very Best of Supertramp  in the Netherlands, although it has now replaced the Arcade version.

Track listing

The cassette version also included "Even in the Quietest Moments", "Sister Moonshine" and "Free as a Bird".

Personnel

Supertramp
Rick Davies – vocals, keyboard, harmonica, melodica
Roger Hodgson – vocals, keyboard, guitar (except on "Cannonball") 
Dougie Thomson – bass guitar
John Anthony Helliwell – saxophone, clarinets, vocals
Bob Siebenberg – drums, percussion

Other performers
Christine Helliwell – backing vocals on "Hide in Your Shell"
Vicky Siebenberg – backing vocals on "Hide in Your Shell"
Scott Gorham – backing vocals on "Hide in Your Shell"
Jake Beddoe – saw on "Hide in Your Shell"
Ken Scott – water gong on "Crime of the Century"
Slyde Hyde – trombone, tuba on "Breakfast in America"
Marty Walsh – guitar on "Cannonball"
Doug Wintz – trombone on "Cannonball"

Production
Original release:
Producers: Ken Scott and Supertramp
Engineers: Ken Scott, John Jansen, Peter Henderson, Russel Pope, Norman Hall
String arrangements: Richard Hewson
Cover Illustration: Greg Wray
Art direction and design: Norman Moore

Charts

Weekly charts

Year-end charts

Certifications and sales

References 

1990 greatest hits albums
Supertramp compilation albums
A&M Records compilation albums
Albums produced by David Kershenbaum
Albums recorded at Trident Studios
Albums recorded at A&M Studios